CDHS may refer to

 The Central Dauphin High School in Pennsylvania.
 CDHS, a neutrino experiment at CERN.
 The Center for Development of Human Services Research Foundation of SUNY, a human services training agency in New York State.
 Colorado Department of Human Services
 The Cheongju Daeseong High School in Cheongju, Korea.